The 1994 All-Big Eight Conference football team consists of American football players chosen by various organizations for All-Big Eight Conference teams for the 1994 NCAA Division I-A football season.  The selectors for the 1994 season included the Associated Press (AP).

Offensive selections

Quarterbacks
 Kordell Stewart, Colorado (AP-1)
 Chad May, Kansas State (AP-1 [tie])

Running backs
 Rashaan Salaam, Colorado (AP-1)
 Lawrence Phillips, Nebraska (AP-1)

Tight ends
 Christian Fauria, Colorado (AP-1)

Wide receivers
 Michael Westbrook, Colorado (AP-1)
 Tyson Schwieger, Kansas State (AP-1)

Centers
 Bryan Stoltenberg, Colorado (AP-1)

Offensive linemen
 Zach Wiegert, Nebraska (AP-1)
 Tony Berti, Colorado (AP-1)
 Brenden Stai, Nebraska (AP-1)
 Hessley Hempstead, Kansas (AP-1)

Defensive selections

Defensive lineman
 Shannon Clavelle, Colorado (AP-1)
 Cedric Jones, Oklahoma (AP-1)
 Tim Colston, Kansas State (AP-1)

Linebackers
 Ed Stewart, Nebraska (AP-1 [ILB])
 Ted Johnson, Colorado (AP-1 [ILB])
 Donta Jones, Nebraska (AP-1 [OLB])
 Troy Dumas, Nebraska (AP-1 [OLB])

Defensive backs
 Joe Gordon, Kansas State (AP-1)
 Chris Hudson, Colorado (AP-1)
 Darrius Johnson, Oklahoma (AP-1)
 Barron Miles, Nebraska (AP-1)

Special teams

Place-kicker
 Scott Blanton, Oklahoma (AP-1)

Punter
 Greg Ivy, Oklahoma State (AP-1)

Coach of the Year
 Tom Osborne, Nebraska (AP-1)

Key

AP = Associated Press

See also
 1994 College Football All-America Team

References

All-Big Seven Conference football team
All-Big Eight Conference football teams